Abū al-Ḥasan ʿAlī ibn Abī Zarʿ al-Fāsī (d. between 1310 and 1320) is the commonly presumed original author of the popular and influential medieval history of Morocco known as Rawd al-Qirtas, said to have been written at the instigation of Marinid Sultan Abu Sa'id Uthman II. His full nasab is sometimes given as ibn Abd Allah ibn Abi Zar and sometimes as ibn Muhammad ibn Ahmad ibn Umar ibn Abi Zar. The uncertainty about his name and authorship of the Rawd is caused by the many variant manuscripts in circulation since the Middle Ages. Very little is known about his life except that he was evidently a scholar at Fes.

Notes

See also
Rawd al-Qirtas – references therein.
Ahmed Siraj: L'Image de la Tingitane. L'historiographie arabe medievale et l'Antiquite nord-africaine. École Française de Rome, 1995. . A brief biographical note gives references to articles (in Arabic) by Moroccan researchers.

14th-century Moroccan historians
Year of birth unknown
1310s deaths
People from Fez, Morocco
13th-century Moroccan historians